Point is the fourth studio album by Japanese musician Cornelius. It was released in Japan on October 24, 2001, by Trattoria Records, and in the United States on January 22, 2002, by Matador Records. Point peaked at number four on the Oricon Albums Chart. The album was reissued on CD by Warner Music Japan in 2019 with a second disc containing the Five Point One music video collection.

Composition
Drowned in Sounds Samuel Rosean described Point as a Shibuya-kei album, albeit "in only the most abstract and contextual manner", noting that its "spacey guitar and synth-heavy production" was more comparable to that of works by artists such as Stereolab and the Notwist.

Critical reception

At Metacritic, which assigns a weighted average score out of 100 to reviews from mainstream critics, Point received an average score of 82 based on 24 reviews, indicating "universal acclaim". Ty Burr of Entertainment Weekly described Point as "11 irresistible sound collages that feature driving beats, amiable guitar acoustics, and a quadraphonic sense of aural play that encourages rampant headphone abuse." LA Weeklys Dan Epstein found it to be a "consistently whimsical and inventive" record, while The A.V. Clubs Noel Murray called it "a magnificent piece of pop architecture."

AllMusic editor Heather Phares found that while Point eschews the "stylistic about-faces" of its predecessor Fantasma, "the restraint and cohesion [Cornelius] brings to the album make its louder and crazier moments... that much more distinctive." Blenders Alex Pappademas deemed it an improvement over Fantasma, with less "stylistic range" but a more refined pop sensibility. Fiona Sturges of The Independent found that Cornelius had "honed his cut-and-paste sensibilities into something more coherent and utterly beautiful." Nick Southall of Stylus Magazine said, "More rounded and less determinedly schizo than Fantasma, Point is a great album of delicious odd-pop made by a whimsically modest genius." Guardian critic Garry Mulholland was more critical, panning the music as "noises in search of a song, a groove or, indeed, a point."

Music videos
For the album's tour, Cornelius and his band created music videos for each song, which played behind them. In The Daily Telegraph, Richard Wolfson said of the overall effect: "A Cornelius show is a blur of precision-perfect stops and starts, visual gags, unusual camera angles and sudden visceral leaps into new musical and visual styles." On July 23, 2003, the Felicity and Polystar labels released a DVD titled Five Point One containing all the songs' music videos.

Track listing

Personnel
Credits are adapted from the album's liner notes.

 Keigo Oyamada – performance, production
 Masakazu Kitayama – sleeve design, photography
 Mikiko Kuwahara – violin
 Yohei Matsuoka – cello
 Toyoaki Mishima – programming, recording
 Tohru Takayama – mastering, mixing
 Ayako Ueda – viola

Charts

References

External links
 
 

2001 albums
Cornelius (musician) albums
Matador Records albums
Japanese-language albums
Sound collage albums